Joshua Lincoln Alexander Primo (born December 24, 2002) is a Canadian professional basketball player who last played for the San Antonio Spurs of the National Basketball Association (NBA). He played college basketball for the Alabama Crimson Tide.

High school career
Primo played basketball for Huntington Prep School in Huntington, West Virginia, where he was teammates with JT Thor. He transferred to Royal Crown Academic School in Scarborough, Toronto. Primo reclassified to the 2020 class and graduated early. Considered a five-star recruit by 247Sports, he committed to playing college basketball for Alabama, choosing the Crimson Tide over Creighton.

College career
In his freshman season, Primo was the youngest player in college basketball. He averaged 8.1 points and 3.4 rebounds per game and was named to the Southeastern Conference (SEC) All-Freshman Team. Primo missed three games with a left medial collateral ligament sprain. On April 21, 2021, he declared for the 2021 NBA draft while maintaining his college eligibility. However on June 30, Primo announced he would remain in the draft due to a strong performance at the NBA combine.

Professional career

San Antonio Spurs (2021–2022)
Primo was selected with the 12th pick in the 2021 NBA draft by the San Antonio Spurs. Primo was later included in the 2021 NBA Summer League roster of the Spurs. On August 11, 2021, the San Antonio Spurs announced that they had signed Primo. On October 20, 2021, Primo made his debut in the NBA, coming off the bench in the final five minutes with three points in a 123–97 win over the Orlando Magic, while Primo had been regarded as the youngest player who attended college to play in the NBA. On October 27, 2021, Primo received his first assignment to Austin Spurs.

Primo was the youngest player in the NBA during the 2021–22 season.

Indecent exposure allegations 
Primo was waived by the Spurs on October 28, 2022. In a statement released by ESPN through Adrian Wojnarowski, he is seeking mental health treatment due to a "previous trauma". The next day, it was revealed that Primo allegedly exposed himself to several women. In November, the team's sports psychologist filed a lawsuit against Primo and the team, alleging multiple incidents of indecent exposure. Primo's lawyer then released a statement which denied any wrongdoing, asserting that any exposure was unwitting, and that the accuser was not acting in good faith.

National team career
Primo represented Canada at the 2019 FIBA Under-19 Basketball World Cup in Greece. At age 16, he was the youngest player on the team and averaged 4.2 points per game.

Career statistics

NBA

|-
| style="text-align:left;"| 
| style="text-align:left;"| San Antonio
| 50 || 16 || 19.3 || .374 || .307 || .746 || 2.3 || 1.6 || .4 || .5 || 5.8
|-
| style="text-align:left;"| 
| style="text-align:left;"| San Antonio
| 4 || 0 || 23.3 || .346 || .250 || .778 || 3.3 || 4.5 || .3 || .5 || 7.0
|- class="sortbottom"
| style="text-align:center;" colspan="2"| Career
| 54 || 16 || 19.6 || .372 || .302 || .750 || 2.3 || 1.8 || .4 || .5 || 5.9

College

|-
| style="text-align:left;"| 2020–21
| style="text-align:left;"| Alabama
| 30 || 19 || 22.5 || .431 || .381 || .750 || 3.4 || .8 || .6 || .3 || 8.1

Personal life
Primo's older sister, Keshia, played college basketball at the University at Buffalo, Coffeyville Community College, and Southern Connecticut State University.

References

External links
Alabama Crimson Tide bio

2002 births
Living people
Alabama Crimson Tide men's basketball players
Austin Spurs players
Basketball players from Toronto
Canadian expatriate basketball people in the United States
Canadian men's basketball players
San Antonio Spurs draft picks
San Antonio Spurs players
Shooting guards